Lake Wappapello is a reservoir on the St. Francis River, formed by Wappapello Dam. The reservoir lies mostly in Wayne County, but its southernmost reaches (near the dam) extend into northern Butler County, both in Missouri. Both the dam and reservoir are owned and operated for the public by the United States Army Corps of Engineers.

Its primary purpose is flood control, although it has been developed as a recreational area with ample opportunities to boat, fish, swim or camp. The fish population of the lake include white bass, largemouth bass, crappie, and bluegill. Lake Wappapello State Park is composed of territory on the southwestern side of the lake.

References

External links
U.S. Army Corps of Engineers - Lake Wallapello
 

Reservoirs in Missouri
Protected areas of Butler County, Missouri
Protected areas of Wayne County, Missouri
Buildings and structures in Butler County, Missouri
Buildings and structures in Wayne County, Missouri
Dams in Missouri
United States Army Corps of Engineers dams
Bodies of water of Butler County, Missouri
Bodies of water of Wayne County, Missouri